Silesites is an ammonite genus placed in the family Silesitidae. Species in this genus were fast-moving nektonic carnivores. They lived during the Cretaceous, in the Barremian age. The type species of the genus is Silesites seranonis .

Species
 Silesites seranonis
 Silesites vulpes

Distribution
Fossils of species within this genus have been found in the Cretaceous sediments of Antarctica, France, Hungary, Italy, Mexico, Morocco, Slovakia, Spain.

References

Cretaceous ammonites
Fossils of Mexico
Fossils of Antarctica
Desmoceratoidea
Ammonitida genera